Shahnaz Rahman was a Nepalese politician, belonging to the People's Socialist Party. She was serving as the member of the 2nd Federal Parliament of Nepal when she passed away due to a cardiac arrest. In the 2022 Nepalese general election she was elected as a proportional representative from the Nepalese Muslims category.

References

Living people
Nepal MPs 2022–present
Year of birth missing (living people)